Gertjan Lankhorst (born 22 December 1957 in Amsterdam) is a Dutch business executive and the former CEO of GasTerra. He was appointed CEO in September 2006. Prior to that appointment, he served successively as the Director of Oil & Gas, Director of Competition, and Director-general of Energy within the Ministry of Economic Affairs (Netherlands). He graduated from Vrije Universiteit Amsterdam.; he also served as president of the Royal Dutch Gas Association and Eurogas.

References

1957 births
Living people
Dutch chief executives
Vrije Universiteit Amsterdam alumni
Businesspeople from Amsterdam